Radio Televizija APR is a local broadcasting company based in Rožaje, Montenegro. The programme of RTV APR can be seen in the Rožaje and Berane.

Television stations in Montenegro
Radio stations in Montenegro
Rožaje